The Khalifa are a predominantly Muslim caste based in Valsad district, Gujarat, India; also residing within Islamabad the capital of Pakistan and Lyari, Karachi, Pakistan. The Khalifa caste are classed as Indo-Arabs as they are believed to be of Yemeni descent, although some claim to have African heritage. Traditionally barbers and musicians, many immigrated to the United Kingdom in the 1960s, and are today active in their traditional roles in their adopted country.

References

External links
The Federation of Gujarati Khalifa Muslim Societies of UK

Social groups of Gujarat
Muslim communities of India
Muslim communities of Gujarat